is a Japanese voice actress who is affiliated with Aptepro. She made her voice acting debut in 2016, and in 2019 played her first named and first main role as Bocchi Hitori, the protagonist of the anime television series Hitori Bocchi no Marumaru Seikatsu.

Biography 
Morishita initially aspired to become a novelist, but eventually decided to pursue a career in voice acting instead due to her interest in anime. After passing an audition with the talent agency Aptepro, she began training as a voice actress while also pursuing university studies; she became affiliated with the company in 2016. She then played background roles in anime television series such as Harukana Receive and Mitsuboshi Colors. In 2019, she was cast as Bocchi Hitori, the protagonist of the anime series Hitori Bocchi no Marumaru Seikatsu; it was the first time she played a named or main role. Morishita sang the show's opening theme  with her co-stars, and she sang the ending theme . alone.

Filmography

Anime
2017
A Sister's All You Need as Anime narration (episode 6)

2018
Mitsuboshi Colors as Couple woman (episode 3)
Harukana Receive as Girl A (episode 4)

2019
Hitori Bocchi no Marumaru Seikatsu as Bocchi Hitori
Kiratto Pri Chan as Girl

2021
Life Lessons with Uramichi Oniisan as Child

Video games
Genjūhime (2016) as Momotarō
Sōkū no Liberation (2017) 
Megido 72 (2017) as Rune
Uchi no Hime-sama ga Ichiban Kawaii as Natalia
Kurokishi to Shiro no Maou as Jack Frost
Release the Spyce: Secret Fragrance (2019) 
Yuki Yuna is a Hero: Hanayui no Kirameki (2019) 
Seven's Code as Geruta

References

External links 
 Official agency profile 
 

Living people
Japanese video game actresses
Japanese voice actresses
Voice actresses from Kanagawa Prefecture
Year of birth missing (living people)
21st-century Japanese actresses